The 1999 Florida State Seminole baseball team represented Florida State University in the 1999 NCAA Division I baseball season. The Seminoles played their home games at Dick Howser Stadium. The team was coached by Mike Martin in his 20th season at Florida State.

The Seminoles lost the College World Series, defeated by the Miami Hurricanes in the championship game.

Roster

Schedule 

! style="" | Regular Season (46–10)
|- valign="top" 

|- align="center" bgcolor="#ccffcc"
| January 29 || No. 9 ||  || Dick Howser Stadium • Tallahassee, FL || W 9–2 || McDonald (1–0) || – || 2,032 || 1–0 || –
|- align="center" bgcolor="#ccffcc"
| January 30 || No. 9 || UNC Asheville || Dick Howser Stadium • Tallahassee, FL || W 16–3 || Stocks (1–0) || – || 2,127 || 2–0 || –
|- align="center" bgcolor="#ccffcc"
| January 31 || No. 9 || UNC Asheville || Dick Howser Stadium • Tallahassee, FL || W 11–3 || Varnes (1–0) || – || 853 || 3–0 || –
|- align="center" bgcolor="#ccffcc"
| February 5 || No. 9 || No. 27  || Dick Howser Stadium • Tallahassee, FL || W 4–1 || Ginn (1–0) || – || 2,361 || 4–0 || –
|- align="center" bgcolor="#ccffcc"
| February 6 || No. 9 || No. 27 Arizona State || Dick Howser Stadium • Tallahassee, FL || W 11–4 || Chavez (1–0) || – || 4,023 || 5–0 || –
|- align="center" bgcolor="#ccffcc"
| February 7 || No. 9 || No. 27 Arizona State || Dick Howser Stadium • Tallahassee, FL || W 7–5 || C. Whidden (1–0) || – || 2,578 || 6–0 || –
|- align="center" bgcolor="#ccffcc"
| February 12 || No. 2 ||  || Dick Howser Stadium • Tallahassee, FL || W 17–3 || Varnes (2–0) || – || 834 || 7–0 || –
|- align="center" bgcolor="#ccffcc"
| February 13 || No. 2 || Troy State || Dick Howser Stadium • Tallahassee, FL || W 21–1 || McDonald (2–0) || – || 1,018 || 8–0 || –
|- align="center" bgcolor="#ccffcc"
| February 14 || No. 2 || Troy State || Dick Howser Stadium • Tallahassee, FL || W 10–2 || Stocks (2–0) || – || 2,578 || 9–0 || –
|- align="center" bgcolor="#ccffcc"
| February 16 || No. 1 ||  || Dick Howser Stadium • Tallahassee, FL || W 12–2 || Smalley (1–0) || – || 803 || 10–0 || –
|- align="center" bgcolor="#ccffcc"
| February 17 || No. 1 || Charleston Southern || Dick Howser Stadium • Tallahassee, FL || W 7–2 || Varnes (3–0) || – || 503 || 11–0 || –
|- align="center" bgcolor="#ffcccc"
| February 20 || No. 1 || No. 7 Florida || Dick Howser Stadium • Tallahassee, FL || L 5–6 || – || Chavez (1–1) || 4,841 || 11–1 || –
|- align="center" bgcolor="#ccffcc"
| February 21 || No. 1 || No. 7 Florida || Dick Howser Stadium • Tallahassee, FL || W 12–3 || Stocks (3–0) || – || 4,612 || 12–1 || –
|- align="center" bgcolor="#ffcccc"
| February 27 || No. 1 || at No. 6 Florida || Alfred A. McKethan Stadium • Gainesville, FL || L 2–4 || – || Chavez (1–2) || 5,657 || 12–2 || –
|- align="center" bgcolor="#ccffcc"
| February 28 || No. 1 || at No. 6 Florida || Alfred A. McKethan Stadium • Gainesville, FL || W 8–4 || Stocks (4–0) || – || 5,203 || 13–2 || –
|-

|- align="center" bgcolor="#ccffcc"
| March 2 || No. 1 ||  || Dick Howser Stadium • Tallahassee, FL || W 5–2 || Varnes (4–0) || – || 733 || 14–2 || –
|- align="center" bgcolor="#ffcccc"
| March 5 || No. 1 || vs No. 17  || Metrodome • Minneapolis, MN || L 1–8 || – || McDonald (2–1) || 579 || 14–3 || –
|- align="center" bgcolor="#ccffcc"
| March 6 || No. 1 || at  || Metrodome • Minneapolis, MN || W 9–5 || Stocks (5–0) || – || 6,293 || 15–3 || –
|- align="center" bgcolor="#ccffcc"
| March 7 || No. 1 || vs  || Metrodome • Minneapolis, MN || W 8–5 || C. Whidden (2–0) || – || 243 || 16–3 || –
|- align="center" bgcolor="#ccffcc"
| March 12 || No. 2 ||  || Dick Howser Stadium • Tallahassee, FL || W 10–3 || McDonald (3–1) || – || 2,246 || 17–3 || 1–0
|- align="center" bgcolor="#ccffcc"
| March 13 || No. 2 || Virginia || Dick Howser Stadium • Tallahassee, FL || W 2–1 || Stocks (6–0) || – || 1,976 || 18–3 || 2–0
|- align="center" bgcolor="#ccffcc"
| March 14 || No. 2 || Virginia || Dick Howser Stadium • Tallahassee, FL || W 11–3 || Varnes (5–0) || – || 1,571 || 19–3 || 3–0
|- align="center" bgcolor="#ccffcc"
| March 16 || No. 1 || The Citadel || Dick Howser Stadium • Tallahassee, FL || W 10–6 || Ginn (2–0) || – || 924 || 20–3 || –
|- align="center" bgcolor="#ccffcc"
| March 17 || No. 1 || The Citadel || Dick Howser Stadium • Tallahassee, FL || W 8–4 || Z. Diaz (1–0) || – || 909 || 21–3 || –
|- align="center" bgcolor="#ccffcc"
| March 19 || No. 1 || at No. 19  || Doak Field • Raleigh, NC || W 14–4 || McDonald (4–1) || – || 2,243 || 22–3 || 4–0
|- align="center" bgcolor="#ccffcc"
| March 20 || No. 1 || at No. 19 NC State || Doak Field • Raleigh, NC || W 2–1 || Stocks (7–0) || – || 2,097 || 23–3 || 5–0
|- align="center" bgcolor="#ccffcc"
| March 21 || No. 1 || at No. 19 NC State || Doak Field • Raleigh, NC || W 13–1 || Varnes (6–0) || – || 2631 || 24–3 || 6–0
|- align="center" bgcolor="#ccffcc"
| March 23 || No. 1 ||  || Dick Howser Stadium • Tallahassee, FL || W 7–4 || Smith (1–0) || – || 931 || 25–3 || –
|- align="center" bgcolor="#ccffcc"
| March 24 || No. 1 || Akron || Dick Howser Stadium • Tallahassee, FL || W 12–2 || Smalley (2–0) || – || 614 || 26–3 || –
|- align="center" bgcolor="#ccffcc"
| March 26 || No. 1 || No. 3  || Dick Howser Stadium • Tallahassee, FL || W 12–6 || McDonald (5–1) || – || 3,155 || 27–3 || 7–0
|- align="center" bgcolor="#ccffcc"
| March 27 || No. 1 || No. 3 North Carolina || Dick Howser Stadium • Tallahassee, FL || W 5–4 || Chavez (2–2) || – || 3,604 || 28–3 || 8–0
|- align="center" bgcolor="#ccffcc"
| March 28 || No. 1 || No. 3 North Carolina || Dick Howser Stadium • Tallahassee, FL || W 9–4 || Varnes (7–0) || – || 2,891 || 29–3 || 9–0
|- align="center" bgcolor="#ccffcc"
| March 30 || No. 1 ||  || Dick Howser Stadium • Tallahassee, FL || W 14–1 || Smalley (3–0) || – || 1,217 || 30–3 || –
|-

|- align="center" bgcolor="#ccffcc"
| April 2 || No. 1 || No. 23  || Dick Howser Stadium • Tallahassee, FL || W 7–4 || Chavez (3–2) || – || 2,326 || 31–3 || 10–0
|- align="center" bgcolor="#ccffcc"
| April 3 || No. 1 || No. 23 Wake Forest || Dick Howser Stadium • Tallahassee, FL || W 16–3 || Stocks (8–0) || – || 2,726 || 32–3 || 11–0
|- align="center" bgcolor="#ccffcc"
| April 4 || No. 1 || No. 23 Wake Forest || Dick Howser Stadium • Tallahassee, FL || W 4–3 || Ginn (3–0) || – || 1,679 || 33–3 || 12–0
|- align="center" bgcolor="#ccffcc"
| April 7 || No. 1 ||  || Dick Howser Stadium • Tallahassee, FL || W 8–6 || Chavez (4–2) || – || 1,397 || 34–3 || –
|- align="center" bgcolor="#ccffcc"
| April 9 || No. 1 || Clemson || Dick Howser Stadium • Tallahassee, FL || W 8–0 || McDonald (6–1) || – || 3,543 || 35–3 || 13–0
|- align="center" bgcolor="#ffcccc"
| April 10 || No. 1 || Clemson || Dick Howser Stadium • Tallahassee, FL || L 4–8 || – || Stocks (8–1) || 5,021 || 35–4 || 13–1
|- align="center" bgcolor="#ccffcc"
| April 11 || No. 1 || Clemson || Dick Howser Stadium • Tallahassee, FL || W 5–3 || Chavez (5–2) || – || 2,472 || 36–4 || 14–1
|- align="center" bgcolor="#ccffcc"
| April 14 || No. 1 || at Jacksonville || John Sessions Stadium • Jacksonville, FL || W 25–2 || Z. Diaz (2–0) || – || 1,541 || 37–4 || –
|- align="center" bgcolor="#ccffcc"
| April 16 || No. 1 || No. 5 Miami (FL) || Dick Howser Stadium • Tallahassee, FL || W 8–2 || McDonald (7–1) || – || 4,489 || 38–4 || –
|- align="center" bgcolor="#ffcccc"
| April 17 || No. 1 || No. 5 Miami (FL) || Dick Howser Stadium • Tallahassee, FL || L 3–4 || – || C. Whidden (2–1) || 5,053 || 38–5 || –
|- align="center" bgcolor="#ffcccc"
| April 18 || No. 1 || No. 5 Miami (FL) || Dick Howser Stadium • Tallahassee, FL || L 7–8 || – || Chavez (5–3) || 3,850 || 38–6 || –
|- align="center" bgcolor="#ffcccc"
| April 23 || No. 2 || at No. 1 Miami (FL) || Mark Light Field • Miami, FL || L 7–8 || – || Chavez (5–4) || 4,903 || 38–7 || –
|- align="center" bgcolor="#ffcccc"
| April 24 || No. 2 || at No. 1 Miami (FL) || Mark Light Field • Miami, FL || L 4–9 || – || Varnes (7–1) || 5,062 || 38–8 || –
|- align="center" bgcolor="#ffcccc"
| April 25 || No. 2 || at No. 1 Miami (FL) || Mark Light Field • Miami, FL || L 8–9 || – || Z. Diaz (1–2) || 3,122 || 38–9 || –
|- align="center" bgcolor="#ffcccc"
| April 30 || No. 4 || at  || Russ Chandler Stadium • Atlanta, GA || L 2–3 || – || McDonald (7–2) || 1,897 || 38–10 || 14–2
|-

|- align="center" bgcolor="#ccffcc"
| May 1 || No. 4 || at Georgia Tech || Russ Chandler Stadium • Atlanta, GA || W 18–4 || Varnes (8–1) || – || 2,263 || 39–10 || 15–2
|- align="center" bgcolor="#ccffcc"
| May 2 || No. 4 || at Georgia Tech || Russ Chandler Stadium • Atlanta, GA || W 4–2 || Chavez (6–4) || – || 2,035 || 40–10 || 16–2
|- align="center" bgcolor="#ccffcc"
| May 7 || No. 4 || at  || Shipley Field • College Park, MD || W 9–3 || McDonald (8–2) || – || 602 || 41–10 || 17–2
|- align="center" bgcolor="#ccffcc"
| May 8 || No. 4 || at Maryland || Shipley Field • College Park, MD || W 13–4 || Ginn (4–0) || – || 907 || 42–10 || 18–2
|- align="center" bgcolor="#ccffcc"
| May 9 || No. 4 || at Maryland || Shipley Field • College Park, MD || W 26–2 || Stocks (9–1) || – || 357 || 43–10 || 19–2
|- align="center" bgcolor="#ccffcc"
| May 15 || No. 4 || at  || Jack Coombs Field • Durham, NC || W 11–3 || Varnes (9–1) || – || 323 || 44–10 || 20–2
|- align="center" bgcolor="#ccffcc"
| May 15 || No. 4 || at Duke || Jack Coombs Field • Durham, NC || W 9–1 || Stocks (10–1) || – || 323 || 45–10 || 21–2
|- align="center" bgcolor="#ccffcc"
| May 16 || No. 4 || at Duke || Jack Coombs Field • Durham, NC || W 7–2 || Smalley (4–0) || – || 348 || 46–10 || 22–2
|-

|-
! style="" | Postseason (11–4)
|- 

|- align="center" bgcolor="#ccffcc"
| May 19 || No. 2 (1) || vs (8) Maryland || Durham Bulls Athletic Park • Durham, NC || W 4–1 || McDonald (9–2) || – || 1,341 || 47–10 || 1–0
|- align="center" bgcolor="#ccffcc"
| May 20 || No. 2 (1) || vs (5) No. 27 Georgia Tech || Durham Bulls Athletic Park • Durham, NC || W 7–3 || Varnes (10–1) || – || 1,419 || 48–10 || 2–0
|- align="center" bgcolor="#ffcccc"
| May 21 || No. 2 (1) || vs (2) No. 15 Wake Forest || Durham Bulls Athletic Park • Durham, NC || L 0–4 || – || Stocks (10–2) || 4,661 || 48–11 || 2–1
|- align="center" bgcolor="#ffcccc"
| May 22 || No. 2 (1) || vs (3) No. 19 Clemson || Durham Bulls Athletic Park • Durham, NC || L 7–8 || – || Chavez (6–5) || 3,742 || 48–12 || 2–2
|-

|- align="center" bgcolor="#ccffcc"
| May 28 || No. 3 (1) || (4) The Citadel || Dick Howser Stadium • Tallahassee, FL || W 24–6 || Varnes (11–1) || – || 3,782 || 49–12 || 1–0
|- align="center" bgcolor="#ccffcc"
| May 29 || No. 3 (1) || (3) Jacksonville || Dick Howser Stadium • Tallahassee, FL || W 9–2 || Stocks (11–2) || – || 3,726 || 50–12 || 2–0
|- align="center" bgcolor="#ccffcc"
| May 30 || No. 3 (1) || (2)  || Dick Howser Stadium • Tallahassee, FL || W 14–3 || Ginn (5–0) || – || 3,921 || 51–12 || 3–0
|-

|- align="center" bgcolor="#ccffcc"
| June 4 || No. 3 (2) || No. 15  || Dick Howser Stadium • Tallahassee, FL || W 10–2 || Stocks (12–2) || – || 5,137 || 52–12 || 1–0
|- align="center" bgcolor="#ccffcc"
| June 5 || No. 3 (2) || No. 15 Auburn || Dick Howser Stadium • Tallahassee, FL || W 6–3 || Z. Diaz (3–1) || – || 5,218 || 53–12 || 2–0
|-

|- align="center" bgcolor="#ccffcc"
| June 12 || No. 3 (2) || vs (7) No. 6 Texas A&M || Rosenblatt Stadium • Omaha, NE || W 7–3 || Chavez (7–5) || – || 19,745 || 54–12 || 1–0
|- align="center" bgcolor="#ffcccc"
| June 14 || No. 3 (2) || vs (6) No. 5 Stanford || Rosenblatt Stadium • Omaha, NE || L 6–10 || – || McDonald (9–3) || 17,000 || 54–13 || 1–1
|- align="center" bgcolor="#ccffcc"
| June 16 || No. 3 (2) || vs (3) No. 4  || Rosenblatt Stadium • Omaha, NE || W 7–2 || Chavez (8–5) || – || 22,155 || 55–13 || 2–1
|- align="center" bgcolor="#ccffcc"
| June 17 || No. 3 (2) || vs (6) No. 5 Stanford || Rosenblatt Stadium • Omaha, NE || W 8–6 || Z. Diaz (4–1) || – || 19,021 || 56–13 || 3–1
|- align="center" bgcolor="#ccffcc"
| June 18 || No. 3 (2) || vs (6) No. 5 Stanford || Rosenblatt Stadium • Omaha, NE || W 14–11 || Stocks (13–2) || – || 11,600 || 57–13 || 4–1
|- align="center" bgcolor="#ffcccc"
| June 19 || No. 3 (2) || vs (1) No. 1 Miami (FL) || Rosenblatt Stadium • Omaha, NE || L 5–6 || – || Varnes (11–2) || 23,563 || 57–14 || 4–2
|-

Awards and honors 
Marshall McDougall
 College World Series Most Outstanding Player
 Atlantic Coast Conference Baseball Player of the Year
 All-Tournament Team

Matt Diaz
 All-Tournament Team

Jeremiah Klosterman
 All-Tournament Team

Sam Scott
 All-Tournament Team

Chris Chavez
 All-Tournament Team

Seminoles in the 1999 MLB Draft 
The following members of the Florida State Seminoles baseball program were drafted in the 1999 Major League Baseball Draft.

References 

Florida State Seminoles baseball seasons
College World Series seasons
Florida State Seminoles
Florida State
Florida State